Sage Ridge is the only non-sectarian college preparatory school in the metropolitan area of the U.S. city of Reno, Nevada. It offers a diverse academic environment for grades 3 through 12 through the teaching of various mathematics, science, English, history, Spanish and Latin classes. The curriculum is supplemented with an array of fine arts classes, including various music, art and theater courses. The school is accredited by the NWAIS (Northwest Association of Independent Schools).

Campus and facilities 
It has a view of the city, which is directly north of the campus. Two buildings and portable classroom comprise the main campus, along with a multipurpose field behind the school. The three buildings, Crossbow Hall, the Webster Building and the learning cottage, have undergone extensive renovations over the last couple of years.

Webster Hall houses a multipurpose room, called the Great Space, with a non-regulation sized basketball court surrounded by classrooms, the main office and the library. The Great Space is used for everything from middle school physical education to weekly school meetings. The Loft is a space for the Upper School (high school) to eat lunch and socialize with views of Mount Rose.

Extracurricular activities

Athletics 
The school competes in the 1A and 2A division of the NIAA of the Northern Region. In recent years, Sage Ridge's cross country team has ranked top in the Nevada state competition for both boys and girls. It offers a variety of sports, including volleyball, cross country, swimming, golf, basketball and track and field.

The boys' cross country team won the 2A state championships in 2004, 2006 and 2007. It was runner-up in 2003, 2005 and 2011. The team finished fourth in 2009 and 2010.
The girl's cross country team won the 2A state championships in 2007 and 2008. It was runner-up in 2006 and 2009.

Both boys' and girls' track teams have had many individual state titles in events such as 100, 4x100, 400, 4x400, 800, 1600, 3200 and long jump. Three state records were set in 2007 by Nathan Chellman at the Championship meet in the 800, 1600 and 3200 meters.

Nevada Interscholastic Activities Association State Championships 
 Cross country (boys') - 2004, 2006, 2007
 Cross country (girls') - 2007, 2008

Theater 
In recent years thel drama department has presented a number of high-reaching productions of plays and musicals such as The Mousetrap, Guys and Dolls, A Streetcar Named Desire, Chekhov's The Boor and The Seagull, Little Shop of Horrors, Macbeth, Oliver!, Romeo and Juliet, The Crucible, The Taming of the Shrew and Battle Born. Several drama students at have graduated to go on to study theater at drama schools and to work in drama and theater. The school's theater club attended and performed a play written especially for the experience at the world famous Edinburgh Festival Fringe in 2014.

Clubs 
School clubs are a major part of the school. It is mandatory that every student participates in at least one club each year.

Current high school clubs
The Ridge - school newspaper
The Prism - arts and literature magazine
Yearbook
Junior Classical League
Debate
Competitive FIRST Robotics
American Mathematics Competitions
Bridge
Art
Juicing
She's the First
Astronomy
Military History

Travel 
Every fall, the school has an outdoor education week for students. Each grade goes to a different destination to spend a week in the outdoors. The trips usually include outdoor activities such as hiking and camping.

Student organizations 
Student organizations interact with one another and communicate with Sage Ridge students to create school policies.

Prefecture — a teacher-elected group of students that maintains communication between students and faculty
Honor Council — an organization consisting of a teacher-nominated, student-elected body
Student Government — student-elected representatives

Publications 
The Ridge — school newspaper; updated online biweekly and in print every semester
The Prism — bi-annual literary magazine
 Vestigia — yearbook

References

External links 
Official school web site

High schools in Reno, Nevada
Private high schools in Nevada
Educational institutions established in 1998
1998 establishments in Nevada